The Staatsbewind (translated into English as "state council" or "state authority") was a governing council of the Batavian Republic between 1801 and 1805. The presidents of the Staatsbewind were acting heads of state of the Batavian Republic.

Reign of the Staatsbewind
The Staatsbewind came into power after a coup d'état against the Uitvoerend Bewind on 17 October 1801. The reign of the Staatsbewind ended on 29 April 1805, when emperor Napoleon of France appointed Rutger Jan Schimmelpenninck as grand pensionary of the Batavian Republic.

Dutch heads of state 1801-1805
Willem Aernout de Beveren 17 October 1801 - 31 January 1802
Egbert Sjuck Gerrold Juckema van Burmania Rengers 1 February 1802 - 30 April 1802
Samuel van Hoogstraten 1 May 1802 - 31 July 1802
Gerrit Jan Pijman 1 August 1802 - 31 October 1802
Johannes Baptista Verheyen 1 November 1802 - 31 January 1803
Jacobus Spoors 1 February 1803 - 30 April 1803
Campegius Hermannus Gockinga 1 May 1803 - 31 July 1803
Daniël Cornelis de Leeuw 1 August 1803 - 31 October 1803
Augustijn Gerhard Besier 1 November 1803 - 31 January 1804
Anthonie Frederik Robbert Evert van Haersolte, Lord van Staverden 1 February 1804 - 30 April 1804
Gerard Brantsen 1 May 1804 - 31 July 1804
Willem Queysen 1 August 1804 - 31 October 1804
Willem Aernout de Beveren 1 November 1804 - 31 January 1805
Jan Bernd Bicker 1 February 1805 - 29 April 1805

Political history of the Batavian Republic
1801 establishments in the Batavian Republic
1805 disestablishments in the Batavian Republic